Chartiers Creek is a tributary of the Ohio River in Western Pennsylvania in the United States. The creek was named after Peter Chartier, a trapper of French and Native American parentage who established a trading post at the mouth of the creek in 1743.

Variant names
According to the Geographic Names Information System, it has also been known historically as:
Chartier's Creek

Course 
Chartiers Creek winds from its headwaters in Washington County through Allegheny County, where it meets the Ohio River at McKees Rocks and Pittsburgh's West End, three miles west of the Point at Pittsburgh.

Tributaries 

(Mouth at the Ohio River)

 Little Chartiers Creek joins Chartiers Creek at Peters Township.
 Chartiers Run joins Chartiers Creek at the borough of Houston.

Environmental issues 

Acid mine drainage, agricultural and industrial runoff, and sewer overflow made Chartiers Creek one of the most polluted watersheds in Pennsylvania. Although improvements have been made, the watershed remains significantly impaired.

The main source of acid mine drainage (Iron) in the Chartiers Creek watershed is the Gladden Discharge along Millers Run Creek, a tributary that meets Chartiers Creek in Bridgeville. In 2020, the South Fayette Conservation Group started a project that will treat the polluted water before it enters Millers Run. This will result in Miller’s Run running clear from Cecil to Bridgeville for the first time in generations, while eliminating the single biggest source of pollution along Chartiers Creek

Plans have been considered to establish the course of Chartiers Creek as a greenway including a multi-use path that would stretch from Canonsburg Lake to the Ohio River. Such a path could eventually provide connections with the Montour Trail near Lawrence, the Panhandle Trail near Carnegie, and the Three Rivers Heritage Trail in McKees Rocks.

See also 

 List of rivers of Pennsylvania
 Ohio River Trail

References

External links 
 U.S. Geological Survey: PA stream gaging stations

Rivers of Pennsylvania
Tributaries of the Ohio River
Rivers of Allegheny County, Pennsylvania
Rivers of Washington County, Pennsylvania